Colonialism in the cinema has been the subject of many books and essays. Stereotyping, distortion, imagistic mistreatment, assimilationism and caricatural visions of colonies have been practiced in this type of cinema. With a few exceptions, such as the film Gandhi, most older films were made with narratives constructed from the point of view of the colonizer nation. During the era of colonialism, many European governments funded film projects which involved their overseas colonies; either for instructional purposes for individuals living in colonies or to support colonialism in general. The United States' settler colonialism resulted in the American westward expansion which led to the establishment of the so-called Western genre, which dealt with many colonialist topics; these have been subverted in Revisionist Westerns, which came about during a re-evaluation of the genre in the 1960s.

In June 2022, the Academy of Motion Picture Arts and Sciences issued a formal written apology to actress and activist Sacheen Littlefeather in relation to the management of her appearance on behalf of Marlon Brando to decline an Academy Award.  In 1973, Brando declined the best actor award (for his role in The Godfather) on his behalf "...in recognition of the misrepresentation and mistreatment of Native American people by the film industry...".

List of colonialism-related films
The following is an alphabetical list of films and series that feature or relate to colonialism.

See also 
 Colonial cinema
 List of films about revolution
 List of films that depict class struggle
 List of films featuring slavery
 List of racism-related films
 Native Americans in film

References

Further Reading & Bibliography

 Baldwin, James. 1976. The Devil finds work: an essay.
 Cowans, Jon. (2018) Film and Colonialism in the Sixties: The Anti-Colonialist Turn in the US, Britain, and France Publisher: Routledge. 292 pp. , 9780429665028.
 Cowans, Jon. (2015) Empire Films and the Crisis of Colonialism, 1946—1959 Johns Hopkins University Press. Project MUSE, 
 Limbrick, P..  (2010) Making Settler Cinemas: Film and Colonial Encounters in the United States, Australia, and New Zealand Author	P. Publisher: Springer. 272 pp. , 9780230107915

 Rice, Tom.  (2019) Films for the Colonies: Cinema and the Preservation of the British Empire, Oakland, University of California Press. 360pp. 
  – originally published in 2001
 Slavin, David Henry. (2001) Colonial Cinema and Imperial France, 1919-1939: White Blind Spots, Male Fantasies, Settler Myths. Baltimore and London: The Johns Hopkins University Press. 300 pp. .
 Stam, R. (1998). Colonialism, Racism, and Representation (with Louise Spence), in the Fifth Edition of Braudy and Cohen, eds., Film Theory and Criticism (New York: Oxford, 1998).

Related Documentaries

 Imagining Indians (1992): a 1992 film produced and directed by Native American filmmaker, Victor Masayesva Jr. (Hopi). The documentary attempts to reveal the misrepresentation of Indigenous culture and tradition in Classical Hollywood films through interviews with different indigenous actors from various tribes in North America. 
 Inventing the Indian (2012): a 2012 BBC documentary that explores the stereotypical view of Native Americans in the United States in cinema and literature.
 Reel Injun (2009): a 2009 Canadian documentary film directed by Cree filmmaker Neil Diamond, Catherine Bainbridge, and Jeremiah Hayes that covers the portrayal of Native Americans in film.

Colonialism
Colonialism in popular culture
Colonialism
Colonialism
Colonialism